Dorothy Janette Marguerite Davis (1916–2005) was a 20th-century American pop singer, noted particularly for her work for Arthur Godfrey.

Biography
Davis was born November 2, 1916, in Memphis, Tennessee, the eldest of eight children. Her full name was Dorothy Janette Marguerite Davis. She grew up in Pine Bluff, Arkansas. She began singing and playing piano on the radio at age fourteen.

Pursuing her career, Davis sang for radio stations in Quincy, Illinois, then Shreveport, Louisiana, then Cincinnati, after which she was a regular on NBC's Red Skelton show in 1939 and 1940. She then moved to Chicago and was a regular on Don McNeill's and Garry Moore's radio shows, then on various shows on radio station WBBM.

Davis then became a radio staff singer for CBS in New York. There she was noticed by Arthur Godfrey who hired her in April 1946 as his resident female singer. The Arthur Godfrey show became very popular and earned Davis national exposure.

In 1947–1948 she had her own 15-minute radio show; her theme song was "I'll Get By". She appeared on programs and recorded the hillbilly song "I Didn't Know the Gun Was Loaded" which became her biggest hit.

Davis stayed with Godfrey until 1956, when she retired from singing. She then became executive producer of Arthur Godfrey's Talent Scouts until that show's cancellation, after which she retired from show business entirely.

Davis sang the Carolina Rice jingle, which ran nationally from the late 1940s well into the mid 1950s; she called it "my biggest hit record".

Personal life
Davis was married to Robert Jenson from 1939 to 1945. She married Frank Musiello in 1957 and moved to Naples, Florida. She had two children. She died on  April 25, 2005.

References

External links

.

1916 births
2005 deaths
20th-century American women singers
American women pop singers
Singers from Arkansas
Singers from Memphis, Tennessee
People from Pine Bluff, Arkansas
20th-century American singers
21st-century American women